Annika is a British crime drama television series, based on the BBC Radio 4 drama Annika Stranded. Produced by Black Camel Pictures for Alibi and All3Media, the first episode aired on 17 August 2021.

Annika Strandhed is a Detective Inspector in the Scottish Police, recently transferred to the Glasgow Marine Homicide Unit (MHU).
She brings her teenage daughter with her. The relationship between Annika and her daughter is the basis for the sub-plot across all the episodes. Annika regularly breaks the fourth wall to communicate directly with the audience about aspects of the current case and personal matters.

Annika is of Norwegian ancestry, mirroring the original radio series Annika Stranded, which was also written by Nick Walker (no relation to Nicola) and featured Nicola Walker in the title role, but was set in Oslo rather than Glasgow.

In August 2022, Annika was confirmed to be returning for a second series.

Cast 
 Nicola Walker as DI Annika Strandhed
 Jamie Sives as DS Michael McAndrews
 Katie Leung as DC Blair Ferguson
 Ukweli Roach as DS Tyrone Clarke
 Kate Dickie as DCI Diane Oban
 Silvie Furneaux as Morgan, Annika's teenage daughter
 Paul McGann as Jake Strathearn, a child therapist

Main Characters
Detective Inspector Annika Strandhed (Nicola Walker) is the lead of the new Marine Homicide Unit (MHU). She is very invested in her job while trying to maintain a good relationship with her daughter Morgan. Her Norwegian ancestry and connections continue to influence her thoughts and emotions though she is now in Scotland. She and DS McAndrew were in police college at the same time but haven't seen each other for years.

Detective Sergeant Michael McAndrews (Jamie Sives) is a senior member of the MHU who lost out to Annika as the lead for the unit and harbours the belief that he is still the best to lead the unit. He views Annika as a smart but prickly individual to deal with. He is the team's search diver.

Detective Sergeant Tyrone Clarke has recently transferred from the Border Command, a police drug investigation unit, to try and reboot his career. He is very goal focused and used to working alone which clashes with the team environment Annika is trying to foster with the MHU.

Detective Constable Blair Ferguson (Katie Leung) is the analyst dealing with the data and technical support for the team. As the youngest member of the team Annika often asks her perspective about something involving Morgan.

Morgan Strandhed is the teenage daughter of Annika. She is regularly in conflict with her mother on various issues and her mother cannot see the teenager's perspective.

Episodes

Production and filming 
Principal photography for the series began on 14 December 2020 and ended on 2 April 2021. Filming took place primarily in Glasgow, on the River Clyde, as well as in towns in Argyll. The Beacon Arts Centre served as the homicide unit's base, and DI Strandhed's home was located on the banks of Loch Lomond.

Music 
The theme music ("Bringing Murder to the Land") was written by Anton Newcombe and Dot Allison.

Reception

Critical response
In The Guardian, the opening episode of the TV series holds a 4-star review. "She’s a daffy Norwegian supercop with a dodgy accent. But Walker’s droll dialogue and womansplaining should keep you waterside for the long haul". The Radio Times rated the same episode with 3 stars: "Not everything works in the first episode of the crime drama – but the central case is gripping enough". The Killing Times also rated the first episode with 3 stars: "It's great to have Walker back on our screens and although Annika feels a bit light – Mare of Easttown it is most assuredly not – it's still worth a watch".

Ratings 
Annika has broken records to become Alibi's most-watched drama for at least seven years. The first episode of the series attracted 410,000 viewers – 2.5 per cent of the audience share, making it the highest-rated programme since the Broadcasters' Audience Research Board (BARB) started recording figures in January 2014.

References

External links

2021 British television series debuts
UKTV original programming
2020s British crime drama television series
2020s British mystery television series
Television shows set in Glasgow
English-language television shows